King Virgil Cheek, J.D. is a lifelong educator who has served as President of Shaw University from 1969 to 1971, and also served as the 7th President of Morgan State University from 1971 to 1974.  He was an active participant in the Civil Rights Movement of the 1950s and 1960s, including participating in the March on Washington in 1963. He is the author of numerous books including The Quadrasoul, novels that explore the four dimensions of the human spirit.

Early life and career
He was born on May 26, 1937 in Weldon, North Carolina, his father was a Baptist minister and his mother was an insurance broker.  Cheek graduated from James B. Dudley High School in Greensboro, North Carolina, and continued his education at Bates College in Lewiston, Maine where he majored in Economics. He received his B.A. in 1959, and later continued his collegiate studies at the University of Chicago where he earned a M.A. degree in 1967. Afterwards, he earned a Juris Doctor (J.D.) from the University of Chicago Law School in 1969.

In 1969, Cheek was appointed the President of Shaw University where he served in that post until 1971. Previously, he had served as Shaw's Dean and Vice President. In 1971, Cheek was appointed as the 7th President of Morgan State University in Baltimore, Maryland, where he served until 1974. In 1978, Cheek made a career change and dedicate more time to leadership development, and created the Center for Leadership and Career Development in Washington, D.C. He has also worked as a professor of Social Science and as Dean of Graduate Studies at the New York Institute of Technology.

References

External links
  

1937 births
Bates College alumni
Living people
Presidents of Morgan State University
People from Weldon, North Carolina
Shaw University
University of Chicago alumni
University of Chicago Law School alumni